PON or Pon may refer to:

Places
PON, the station code for Ponders End railway station in London, England

People
Pon (surname), including a list of people with the surname

Arts, entertainment, and media

Fictional characters
Pon, the Gardener's Boy of Jinxland in L. Frank Baum's The Scarecrow of Oz

Games
Panel de Pon, a game series and the Japanese version of Tetris Attack

Brands and enterprises
 Pon Holdings, a Dutch transportation company

Medicine and science
Paraoxonase, enzymes

Organizations
Polska Organizacja Narodowa, later Polish National Organization
Program on Negotiation, a university consortium

Technology
Command to connect the Point-to-Point Protocol daemon
Passive optical network in fiber optics

Other uses
A day in the Javanese calendar
National Sports Week (Indonesia) (Pekan Olahraga Nasional)
Pohnpeian language, ISO 639 code PON
Polski Owczarek Nizinny, Polish for Polish Lowland Sheepdog
Pon (deity), The Supreme Deity of the Yukaghir people

See also
Pon Pon, an Italian comic strip
"Pon Pon Pon", a song by Kyary Pamyu Pamyu